San Pedro River may refer to:

 San Pedro River (Arizona), a river which flows north from the Mexican state of Sonora into Arizona.
 San Pedro River (Bolivia)
 San Pedro River (Chihuahua)
 San Pedro River (Chile)
 San Pedro de Inacaliri River, Chile, often called simply "San Pedro River"
 San Pedro River (Columbia and Venezuela), a river of the Columbia-Venezuela border
 San Pedro River (Cuba)
 San Pedro River (Guatemala)
 San Pedro River (Panama)
 San Pedro River (Philippines), a tributary of Laguna de Bay
 San Pedro River, Cádiz